Bahgat Group is a group of companies in Egypt that manufacture electronics, household appliances, furniture, and  medical equipment. It is also involved in entertainment and real estate development. Bahgat Group has established a new suburb, Dreamland, and another similar suburb with the same name in Sudan.

Bahgat Group also holds Dream TV channels on Nilesat.

References

External links 
 

Manufacturing companies based in Cairo
Companies with year of establishment missing
Conglomerate companies of Egypt